Ahupe is a village in Ambegaon taluka of Pune District in the state of Maharashtra, India. The village is administrated by a Sarpanch who is an elected representative of village as per constitution of India and Panchayati raj (India).

References contact
Nakul shinde 7666516752/9767629004

https://Sahyadries.in book from this link

Just in 700 Rs

External links
  Villages in pune maharashtra

Villages in Pune district